Jana Novotná was the defending champion but did not compete that year.

Manuela Maleeva-Fragniere won in the final 6–1, 4–6, 7–5 against Iva Majoli.

Seeds
A champion seed is indicated in bold text while text in italics indicates the round in which that seed was eliminated.

  Manuela Maleeva-Fragniere (champion)
  Larisa Neiland (first round)
  Mana Endo (semifinals)
  Pam Shriver (first round)
  Iva Majoli (final)
  Alexandra Fusai (first round)
 n/a
  Kristie Boogert (quarterfinals)

Draw

External links
 1994 Asian Open Draw

Asian Open (tennis)
1994 WTA Tour
1994 in Japanese tennis